Hwang Jae-hwan (born 12 April 2001) is a South Korean footballer who plays as a midfielder or winger for Ulsan.

Career

Hwang started his career with South Korean top flight side Ulsan, helping them win the league. Before the second half of 2019–20, he was sent on loan to 1. FC Köln II in the German fourth tier.

References

External links

 

1. FC Köln II players
2001 births
Association football midfielders
Association football wingers
Expatriate footballers in Germany
K League 1 players
Living people
Regionalliga players
South Korean expatriate footballers
South Korean expatriate sportspeople in Germany
South Korean footballers
Ulsan Hyundai FC players